Catherine Obianuju Acholonu (26 October 1951 – 18 March 2014) was a Nigerian author, researcher and political activist.

She served as the Senior Special Adviser (SSA) to President Olusegun Obasanjo on Arts and Culture, and was a founder-member of the Association of Nigerian Authors (ANA).

Early life, marriage and education
Catherine was born in an affluent Catholic Igbo family to Chief Lazarus Emejuru Olumba and Josephine Olumba, at Umuokwara Village, in the town of Orlu. She was the eldest of four children.

She completed her primary and secondary education in The Holy Rosary School, before being married off at an age of 17 to Brendan Douglas Acholonu, a surgeon from the same clan, who was then-settled in Germany.

Catherine was subsequently enrolled at the University of Düsseldorf as a student of English, American literature, and Germanic linguistics in 1974, from where she post-graduated in 1977. In 1982, she obtained her PhD in Igbo Studies, thus becoming the first African Woman to earn both Masters' and PhD from Dusseldorf. She went on to attend her first conference at the Ibadan conference on Pan Africanism, next year, and presented four papers.

Career

Academia
Acholonu taught at the English Department of Alvan Ikoku Federal College of Education, Owerri since 1978, and had authored over 16 books.

In 1982, she established AFA : A journal of Creative Writing which was the first journal concerned with African literature. In 1986 she was the only Nigerian, and one of the two Africans to participate in the United Nations Expert Group Meeting on "Women, Population and Sustainable Development: the Road to Rio, Cairo and Beijing”. In 1990, she was selected as a Fulbright Scholar by the US government (as a result of her documenting the Igbo roots of Olaudah Equiano, a famed abolitionist and slave autobiographer) and served as a visiting faculty to several private colleges. The African American Studies program was initiated in the Manhattanville College, as a result of her efforts.

She also co-founded the Catherine Acholonu Research Center to focus on historical revisionism centered around Pre-History of the African continent, in what was the first research initiative named after a Nigerian woman.

Politics
In 1992, she had unsuccessfully ran for the post of Nigerian president as a candidate from National Republican Convention. During that time, her husband was the deputy-governor of Imo State from the same party.

From 1999, she served as the Senior Special Adviser (SSA) to President Olusegun Obasanjo on Arts and Culture before resigning in 2002, to contest for the Orlu senatorial district seat of Imo State as a National Democratic Party candidate and re-enter active electoral politics. However, she lost to Arthur Nzeribe.

Works and reception

Poems
Catherine has been widely held as one of the most notable female poets from Nigeria. Her poems have been included in the Heinemann Book of African Female Writers and other anthologies. Afro-Surrealist themes have been noted.

Western and Indigenous Traditions in Modern Igbo Literature
The book was an edited reprint of her PhD thesis by the Dusseldorf University Press; a typical trend in German Universities. Chidi T. Maduka, reviewing over Research in African Literatures, noted it to be an extremely poor agenda-driven work which failed to justify its central theme of English works in Igbo being a part of Igbo literature, and in the process, denounced any and all dissenting views from within academic circles using ad-hominem polemics lacking in logic. Ample misreadings of scholars and serious flaws in bibliographic data were highlighted.

The Igbo Roots of Olaudah Equiano
Her first monograph, it exploited Igbo oral history to locate the ancestral home of Olaudah Equiano in Isseke, Ihiala. However, the findings were rejected near-unanimously and her historiographic methods were widely criticized by other historians.

In a review over The Journal of African History, Elizabeth Isichei noted of it to be an enthusiastic venture in pseudo-history, with a genealogy that allotted ridiculous life-spans to many members of Equiano's family. In a review over Research in African Literatures, Paul Edwards dismissed the entire work as an essential exercise in speculation, which was bereft of any scholarly rigor. Ode Ogede penned a scathing critique of the work and noted of it to be an express example about how oral history can be abused to fulfill preset goals, without any veneer of scholarly rigor and objectivity; he also deemed her to be ignorant about recent studies concerning Olaudah Equiano's autobiography.

Christopher Fyfe reviewing for International Journal of African Historical Studies noted it to be a fascinating contribution to African folk-history but also noted of Edward's critiques, and the presupposition of her findings on the validity of genealogical records assigning extraordinarily long time-spans to Equiano's relatives. Erving Beauregard of the University of Dayton deemed it as an interesting work, that made a plausible case for its central assertion despite her accepting oral testimonies from persons claiming to be 200 years old.

Catherine had rejected her critics, and has been accused of engaging in ad-hominem attacks against them.

Motherism : The Afrocentric Alternative to Feminism
Originating as her Fulbright Scholar Project, it has been since regarded as a pioneering work in the domain of African Gender Studies, and has heavily influenced the development of maternal theory in Western nations. (For more details, see Philosophy section.)

Other works
Her disillusion with Al Gore's west-centric views on sustainable development led her to write the book The Earth Unchained: A Quantum Leap in Consciousness: a reply to Al Gore, which sought to rediscover Africa's lost knowledge and highlight its place in solving global issues. Catherine claimed to have received the contents as a revelation from God in her dream, and allegedly wrote the entire book in about a fortnight.

They Lived Before Adam: Pre-Historic Origins of the Igbo won the Flora Nwapa Award for Literary Excellence and the Philis Wheatley Book Award at the Harlem Book Fair, 2009. The Gram Code of African Adam: Stone Books and Cave Libraries, Reconstructing 450,000 Years of Africa's Lost Civilizations put forward a new transcription system for the Ikom monoliths, and claimed to have established the existence of indigenous writing systems in prehistoric Africa. Critical reception has been poor.

These works are not widely known outside of Nigeria.

Philosophy
Catherine self-identifies as an environmental humanist, and rejects feminism. She disagrees with the thought-schools of Alice Walker, Buchi Emecheta, Flora Nwapa and other feminists, accusing them of harboring excessive misandry and radical concepts like lesbianism squarely situated outside the boundary of African morality, whilst glossing over the concepts of motherhood, central to African femininity. She instead asserts that it is not gender but rather economic status that determines power hierarchies in Africa. Thus, the concept of motherism which promotes a theme of "motherhood, nature and nurture"—itadvocates for a return to traditional pro-natal womanhood, and promotes conciliatory stance rather than confrontations, as to male-female cooperation. Her views have been challenged by the later generation of African feminists.

Catherine views the introduction of Islam in Africa as a form of colonialism, which subverted indigenous African systems and reduced the quality of life for native women.

Death
Acholonu died on 18 March 2014, at an age of 62 from a year-long renal failure.

Honors
She was enlisted among the greatest women achievers of Nigeria by the National Council of Women Societies (NCWS) in 1997. Her works have been selected as reading material for secondary schools and universities in Nigeria, and African Studies Departments of universities across America and Europe.

Bibliography

Poems
 "Going Home"
 "Spring's Last Drop"
 "Dissidents"
 "Harvest of War"
 "Other Forms of Slaughter"

Collections
 The Spring's Last Drop, 1985
 Nigeria in the Year 1999, 1985
 Recite and Learn – Poems for Junior Primary Schools, 1986
 Recite and Learn – Poems for Senior Primary Schools, 1986

Drama and plays
 Trial of the Beautiful Ones: a play in one act, Owerri, Nigeria: Totan, 1985—based on the Igbo ogbanje myth.
 The Deal and Who is the Head of State, Owerri, Nigeria: Totan, 1986
 Into the Heart of Biafra: a play in three acts, Owerri, Nigeria: C. Acholonu, 1970

Essays and non-fiction
 Western and Indigenous Traditions in Modern Igbo Literature , 1985.
 Motherism, The Afrocentric Alternative to Feminism, 1995.
 The Igbo Roots of Olaudah Equiano, 1995, revised 2007.
 The Earth Unchained: A Quantum Leap in Consciousness: a reply to Al Gore, 1995
 Africa the New Frontier – Towards a Truly Global Literary Theory for the 21st Century. Lecture Delivered to the Association of Nigerian Authors annual Convention, 2002.
 The Gram Code of African Adam: Stone Books and Cave Libraries, Reconstructing 450,000 Years of Africa's Lost Civilizations, 2005
 They Lived Before Adam: Pre-Historic Origins of the Igbo – The Never-Been-Ruled (Ndi Igbo since 1.6 million B.C.), 2009. Winner of the USA-based International Book Awards (2009) in the Multi-cultural non-fiction category.
 The Lost Testament of the Ancestors of Adam: Unearthing Heliopolis/Igbo Ukwu – The Celestial City of the Gods of Egypt and India, 2010
 Eden in Sumer on the Niger: Archaeological, Linguistic, and Genetic Evidence of 450,000 Years of Atlantis, Eden and Sumer in West Africa, 2014

Books authored

 The Igbo Roots of Olaudah Equiano: An Anthropological Research Jan 1, 1989
 The Deal and Who is the Head of State
 The Spring's Last Drop
 Nigeria in the year 1999 (TOT Series)
 Into the Heart of Biafra (TOP Series)
 Trial of the Beautiful Ones

Articles and chapters
 (with Joyce Ann Penfield), "Linguistic Processes of Lexical Innovation in Igbo." Anthropological Linguistics. 22 (1980). 118–130.
 "The Role of Nigerian Dancers in Drama." Nigeria Magazine. 53.1 (1985). 33–39.
 "The Home of Olaudah Equiano – A Linguistic and Anthropological Research", The Journal of Commonwealth Literature. 22.1 (1987). 5–16.
 "L'Igbo Langue Litteraire: Le Cas du Nigeria." [Literary Igbo Language: The Case of Nigeria.] Notre Librairie: Revue du Livre: Afrique, Caraibes, Ocean Indien. 98 (Jul–Sept 1989). 26–30.
 "Mother was a Great Man." In The Heinemann Book of African Women's Writing. Ed. Charlotte H. Bruner. London: Heinemann, 1993. 7–14.
 "Motherism: The Afrocentric Alternative to Feminism." Ishmael Reed's Konch Magazine. (March–April 2002).

References

External links
 https://www.thriftbooks.com/a/catherine-obianuju-acholonu/3498556/

External links
 Personal Website

Igbo politicians
1951 births
2014 deaths
Nigerian women in politics
Nigerian women diplomats
Nigerian women poets
Nigerian dramatists and playwrights
People from Imo State
Pseudohistorians
Deaths from kidney failure
20th-century Nigerian poets
20th-century Nigerian dramatists and playwrights
Heinrich Heine University Düsseldorf alumni
Nigerian women academics
Nigerian women historians
Nigerian expatriate academics in the United States
Igbo women writers
20th-century Nigerian women writers
Igbo people